Supaul is a town and a municipality that is headquarters of Supaul district in the Indian state of Bihar. Supaul is the administrative headquarters of this district.

History
Supaul, which was previously a part of Saharsa district, is part of the Mithila region. Mithila first gained prominence after being settled by Indo-Aryan peoples who established the Mithila Kingdom (also called Kingdom of the Videhas).

During the late Vedic period (c. 1100–500 BCE), Videha became one of the major political and cultural centers of South Asia, along with Kuru and Pañcāla. The kings of the Videha Kingdom were called Janakas.
The Videha Kingdom was later incorporated into the Vajjika League, which had its capital in the city of Vaishali, which is also in Mithila.

Transport

Air

Rajbiraj Airport is the nearest airport roughly 76 km away through NH 327A - NH 57 - Western Koshi Embankment Road - Dagmara - Kunauli . Shree Airlines and Buddha Air operates their daily flights between Rajbiraj and Kathmandu, the capital city of Nepal.

But in India, Darbhanga Airport roughly 120 km is the nearest operational airport.

Road
 passes through Supaul. It connects Supaul to Purnia, Siliguri, Guwahati in the east and Darbhanga, Muzaffarpur, Patna and Gorakhpur in the west.

Another state highways connect Supaul to its divisional headquarter Saharsa and the nearest pilgrim sites, Singheshwar and Madhepura.

Rail
Supaul railway station lies on Barauni-Katihar, Saharsa and Purnia sections. Small gauge Train service stopped in year 2015.Train service restarted from Supaul station in 2020.

Geography 
It has an average elevation of 34 metres (111 feet).

Demographics 
 India census, Supaul had a population of 2,228,397 of which male and female were 1,157,815 and 1,070,582 respectively. The initial provisional data suggest a density of 919 in 2011 compared to 714 of 2001.

College and University
 University
 Bhupendra Narayan Mandal University

Notable people
 R.K.Singh, Raj Kumar Singh is a former Indian bureaucrat and a current Minister of State in the Government of India.
 Syed Shahnawaz Hussain, politician, national spokesperson of Bharatiya Janta Party and former cabinet minister
 Govind Kumar Singh, Indian Fashion Designer 
 Dileshwar Kamait is an Indian politician and a member of parliament to the 17th Lok Sabha from Supaul Lok Sabha constituency, Bihar.
 Anup Lal Yadav, member of parliament from Saharsa constituency
 Ranjeet Ranjan, member of parliament from Supaul constituency and Spokesperson of Indian National Congress
 Udit narayan, an Indian playback singer whose songs have been featured mainly in Hindi films. He was born and raised in Supaul

References 

Cities and towns in Supaul district